Unseeded Leonardo Mayer won first edition of this tournament. He defeated Nikola Ćirić, Javier Martí, Horacio Zeballos, Maxime Authom and Thomas Schoorel in the final.

Seeds

  Horacio Zeballos (quarterfinals)
  Thomas Schoorel (final)
  Björn Phau (quarterfinals)
  Teymuraz Gabashvili (quarterfinals)
  Martin Kližan (quarterfinals)
  Simon Greul (second round)
  Uladzimir Ignatik (first round)
  Julian Reister (withdrew due to knee injury)
  Nikola Ćirić (first round)

Draw

Finals

Top half

Bottom half

References
 Main Draw
 Qualifying Draw

Internationaler Apano Cup - Singles